Riley & Cowley was an American marine engineering firm established in 1869 in Brooklyn, New York. The company specialized in the design and manufacture of marine steam engines for small watercraft such as steam yachts, launches and tugboats, and was particularly noted for its light and compact, high-performance, compound and triple expansion engines. The company also produced screw propellers, dredging machinery and other marine equipment. 

By the 1880s, the company was building engines for the pleasure craft of some of New York's wealthiest men, such as R. V. Pierce and Pierre Lorillard III, and by 1890 it was producing some of the smallest triple-expansion engines then built in the United States. In 1902, the company also built a steam car. The company was dissolved in 1905 following the death of one of its founders.

Company history

Establishment 

Reuben Riley was an assistant engineer with the United States Navy during the American Civil War. After receiving his discharge in 1865, Riley returned to New York where, together with engineer Robert Cowley and George Besser, he established a machine shop at 3 Summit Street, Brooklyn, which traded under the name Riley, Cowley & Besser. This partnership was dissolved in October 1868 with the departure of Besser,  but Riley and Cowley retained their business association. 

In 1869, the two remaining partners established a new machine shop in Brooklyn with the company name Riley & Cowley. Prior to 1879, the company was located at 187 Van Brunt Street, on the corner of Van Brunt and Bowne Streets. Riley and Cowley eventually acquired a property on the corner of Richards and Bowne Streets, Brooklyn, and in 1879, plans were announced for the construction on this site of "two one and two-story brick shops, 40x60 and 100 [ft], tin roof and wooden and brick cornice". After the relocation of the company to this address, these buildings appear to have been utilized as "a machine shop, blacksmith shop, pattern shop ... and storehouse." The company would remain at this address for the balance of its 36-year history.

Activities 

Riley & Cowley specialized in the design and manufacture of compound and triple expansion steam propeller engines for small watercraft such as yachts, launches and tow boats. They also designed and built single-cylinder marine engines, marine propellers, machinery for steam dredges, and made engine and boiler repairs. Riley & Cowley engines had a reputation for speed, reliability, economy, compactness, lightness and ease of maintenance. In particular, the companys attention to balancing all parts of an engine to reduce or eliminate vibration resulted in engines capable of achieving optimal performance. Some engines were sufficiently self-contained and light in weight that they could be readily removed from the hull for winter storage. 

Engines built by the company were distributed to "all parts of the United States". The company employed 55 people by the mid-1880s, about half of whom were machinists; the number of employees had risen to 100 by 1902, about forty of whom were machinists.   

By the 1880s, Riley & Cowley were supplying engines to members of New Yorks elite yachting set. Clients of the company included leading political and business identities such as Brooklyn mayor James Howell, patent medicine manufacturer Ray Vaughn Pierce, heir to the Aspinwall fortune, the Rev. John A. Aspinwall, and others.  

An engine of similar pattern was also installed in the steam launch Lillian, a vessel built for tobacco heir Pierre Lorillard III for use as a hunting launch along the East Coast. The engines also featured a simple reversing mechanism that dispensed with the usual linkages. This model of small triple-expansion powerplant seems to have been particularly successful for the company, the type eventually finding its way into "many steam launches and yachts where it has given excellent satisfaction". The company would later build even smaller triple-expansion engines.  

An unusual watercraft to receive a Riley & Cowley engine in 1890 was an "unsinkable"  steam yawl which the inventor, Captain Frank Norton, planned to take across the Atlantic as proof of concept.

In 1891, Riley & Cowley completed the engine for a fast steam launch for the Yale College Boat Club.

Around the same time, a fast steam launch, named Norwood, was completed for Norman L. Munro at the yard of C. D. Mosher. Mosher built both the launch and its engine, but the latter failed to produce adequate performance until overhauled by Riley & Cowley.

Marine engine gallery

Steam car 

In 1902, Riley & Cowley built a steam car to the order of one B. M. Whitlock, in the style of "a high powered, foreign gasoline touring car". The vehicle had two gears—which operated in both forward and reverse, as the engine was run in reverse to reverse the vehicle. The driver steered by means of a  wheel on an inclined column. Two brakes were provided—a steam and a foot brake.  

The boiler, a fire-tube type  in height, was placed at the front of the vehicle, concealed beneath an aluminium bonnet. "Ingenious" exhaust pipes carried the exhaust gases to the rear of the vehicle. Suspension of the vehicle was by leaf springs. The wheels were fitted with  hardened fabric tyres, which could be inflated by means of an inbuilt air pump. This vehicle appears to have been the only steam car ever built by the company.

Closure 

Following the death of Robert Cowley, senior partner in the firm, in January 1905, the company was wound up. In June, the entire equipment of the company, including patterns for engines, propellers, gears, pumps and other machinery, was offered for private sale. 

A few weeks later, in July, the surviving partner, Reuben Riley, established a new business at 192 24th Street, Brooklyn, The Riley Machine Works, capitalized at $6,500. Incorporators of the new firm were Riley, his wife Amanda and son Frank, with Riley serving as company president and Frank as vice-president and general manager. The firm offered "special attention to marine repairs". This company appears to have been dissolved around the time of the death of Rileys wife in May 1908.

About the proprietors 

Reuben Riley was born in Tuckahoe, Westchester County, New York, on October 25, 1838. He received a "good public school education" before travelling to New York in 1854, where he completed a five-year apprenticeship as a machinist and engineer with Henry Esler & Co. of South Brooklyn. During the American Civil War, Riley joined the United States Navy, serving from 1863 to the end of the war aboard , during which time he was promoted from Assistant Engineer to 2nd Assistant Engineer. Discharged from the Navy on August 21, 1865, he returned to New York to co-found the firm of Riley & Cowley. 

Riley married Amanda Hilliker of Tuckahoe, New York in 1860. The couple had four children, including Frank M. Riley, who followed his father into the family business. Riley was a Freemason, an Aid-de-Camp to the Commander in Chief, Grand Army of the Republic, and a member of the board of trustees of the Brooklyn Bridge. A respected engineer, he is known to have given a number of well-received lectures in the field. He became wealthy as a result of his business activities.

Robert Cowley, an engineer, was born in Stockton-on-Tees, England, on January 19, 1836, and emigrated to North America as a young man. He married a Canadian-born woman, Annie Ramsay, in Toronto, Canada, on January 3, 1860. The couple had two children together, Charles Ramsey, who followed his father into the family business, and a daughter Ida, later Mrs. Ida L. Knapp. 

In addition to his work with Riley & Cowley, Cowley was a director of the Hamilton Bank. He was a devout Christian and a board member of the First Place Methodist Church of Brooklyn, which he attended three times a week—for prayer meetings every Wednesday and twice on Sundays. He was also a keen art collector, accumulating a substantial gallery of works through the course of his life, including "many ... by the old masters." Cowley died suddenly on January 12, 1905, at the age of 68. He was survived by his wife and children.

Production table 

The following table represents only a sample of engines built by the company, for some of the more notable watercraft.

Footnotes

References

Bibliography 

  
  
  
  
 
  
  
  
  
  
  
  
  
 
 

1869 establishments in New York (state) 
1905 disestablishments in New York (state) 
Defunct marine engineering companies of New York City
History of Brooklyn
Defunct motor vehicle manufacturers of the United States
Steam cars
Veteran vehicles
1900s cars